John Richardson may refer to:

Academia
John Richardson (translator) (1564–1625), Master of Trinity College, Cambridge, 1615–1625
John Richardson (orientalist) (1740/1–1795), Oxford editor of A Dictionary; Persian, Arabic and English, 1777
John Richardson (philosopher) (born 1951), professor of philosophy at New York University
John M. Richardson (professor) (born 1938), American university professor, system dynamics and Sri Lanka scholar
John V. Richardson Jr., American professor of information studies
John Henry Richardson (1890–1970), British economics professor
John T. Richardson (1923–2022), American academic administrator and priest at DePaul University

Arts
John Richardson (1766–1836), actor who founded the travelling Richardson's Theatre in 1798
John Richardson (actor) (1934–2021), English actor
John Richardson (art historian) (1924–2019), art historian, Picasso biographer
John Richardson (author) (1796–1852), Canadian novelist
John Richardson (drummer) (born 1964), American rock drummer from Illinois
Jayadev (musician) (John Richardson, born 1947), drummer, original member of The Rubettes
John Richardson (poet) (1817–1886), English poet
John Richardson (special effects designer) (born 1946), British designer of visual effects

Business and industry
John Richardson (businessman) (c. 1754–1831), Canadian businessman
John Grubb Richardson (1813–1891), major Irish industrialist who founded the model village of Bessbrook near Newry
John Wigham Richardson (1837–1908), British shipbuilder on Tyneside
John Kobina Richardson (1936–2010), Ghanaian industrialist

Military
John M. Richardson (admiral) (born 1960), American naval admiral, Chief of Naval Operations
John Soame Richardson (1836–1896), British army Major-General, Commander of the Forces New South Wales
John B. Richardson IV, United States Army general

Politics 
John Richardson (colonial administrator) (1679–1741), deputy governor of Anguilla
John Peter Richardson II (1801–1864), governor of South Carolina
John Richardson (New Zealand politician) (1810–1878), speaker of the New Zealand Legislative Council, 1868–1879
John Richardson (New South Wales politician) (1810–1888), Australian pastoralist, store keeper and politician
John S. Richardson (1828–1894), United States congressman from South Carolina, 1879–1883
John Peter Richardson III (1831–1899), governor of South Carolina
John Richardson (Ontario MPP) (1844–1915), Ontario farmer and politician
John Richardson (born 1886) (1886–1976), American attorney and political figure
John Richardson (Canadian MP) (1932–2010), Canadian politician
John Richardson (Australian politician) (born 1938), member of the Victorian Legislative Assembly
John G. Richardson (1957–2020), speaker of the Maine House and candidate for governor
John Richardson Jr. (1921–2014), US Assistant Secretary of State for Educational and Cultural Affairs (1969–1977)

Sports 
John Maunsell Richardson (1846–1912), English cricketer, Member of Parliament and twice winner of the English Grand National
John Richardson (Derbyshire cricketer) (1856–1940), English cricketer for Derbyshire County Cricket Club
John Richardson (tennis) (1873–1???), South African Olympic tennis player
Mick Richardson (John Mettham Richardson, 1874–1920), English footballer active in the 1890s
John Richardson (Yorkshire cricketer) (1908–1985), English cricketer for Yorkshire County Cricket Club
John Richardson (South African cricketer) (born 1935), South African cricketer for North Eastern Transvaal
Jock Richardson (1906–1986), Scottish footballer
John Richardson (American football) (born 1945), American football player for the Miami Dolphins
John Richardson (baseball), American baseball player
John Richardson (footballer, born 1949) (1949–1984), English football player for Brentford, Fulham and Aldershot
John Richardson (footballer, born 1966), English football player for Colchester
John Richardson (rower) (born 1944), Canadian rower who competed in the 1968 Summer Olympics

Religion
John Richardson (bishop of Ardagh) (1580–1654), English bishop of the Church of Ireland
John Richardson (Quaker) (1667–1753), English Quaker minister and autobiographer
John Richardson (Archdeacon of Southwark) (1817–1904), Anglican priest
John Richardson (Archdeacon of Nottingham) (1849–1924), priest in the Church of England
John Richardson (archbishop of Fredericton) (1868–1938), Anglican Church of Canada bishop
John Richardson (bishop of Car Nicobar) (1896–1978), Anglican bishop in India, also M.P.
John Richardson (bishop of Bedford) (born 1937), Church of England bishop
John Richardson (Dean of Bradford) (born 1950), priest in the Church of England
John Richardson (Archdeacon of Derby) (1905–1991), Archdeacon of Derby
John Richardson (Archdeacon of Cleveland) (1676–1735)
John Richardson (dean of Kilmacduagh) (1669–1747)

Others 
John Richardson (judge) (1771–1841), English lawyer and judge in the Court of Common Pleas
Sir John Richardson (naturalist) (1787–1865), Arctic explorer and naturalist 
John Richardson (convict) (1797–1882), Australian convict who accompanied several exploring expeditions as botanical collector
John Reginald Richardson (1912–1997), Canadian-American physicist
John Richardson, Baron Richardson (1910–2004), British physician
John Richardson (Australian Army officer) (1880–1954)

See also
Jonathan Richardson (disambiguation)
Jon Richardson (disambiguation)
Jack Richardson (disambiguation)